IE University is a private university with campuses in Madrid, Community of Madrid and Segovia, Castile and León, (Spain). IE University's programs are run in English and Spanish, and are compliant with the terms of the European Higher Education Area (Bologna Process).

History 
IE (Instituto de Empresa) was founded in Madrid, Spain as a graduate professional school in business and law in 1973 with the goal of fostering an entrepreneurial environment through its various programs. Over the years, it established multiple international partnerships with other universities, such as a dual MBA with Brown University and an Asian-focused program run with Singapore Management University. IE University opened to undergraduates in 2006 and was established in Santa Maria la Real Convent after Instituto de Empresa Ltd. acquired Universidad S.E.K. (S.E.K. are the initials of San Estanislao de Kostka, Saint Stanislaus Kostka in English language), which was founded in 1997 and was owned by the Educational Institution SEK. In 2004, the regulator, the Junta de Castilla y León approved the bylaws of the Universidad S.E.K. On November 30, 2006, the Junta de Castilla y León authorised the partial sale of ownership of Universidad S.E.K. to Instituto de Empresa, S. L. (owner of the IE Business School). In 2007 the Junta approved the modification of the bylaws of the Universidad S.E.K. In 2008 the name was changed from Universidad S.E.K. to IE Universidad in Spanish language, and the commercial name IE University in English language (IE being the initials of Instituto de Empresa). IE university began operations in September 2009 and its first class graduated in 2013.

Campus 

The campus is situated beside the Eresma River, at the foot of the old city walls that surround Segovia's historic quarter and a five-minute walk from Segovia's Roman Aqueduct of Segovia. The IE University campus has a surface area of over 18,000 m/2.

In addition to the existing IE Business school campus, IE University's new campus, known as “Campus IE” and located in the north of Madrid, will host 6,000 students and have a surface area of 50,000m2

Santa Cruz la Real Convent 

According to the Life of Saint Dominic of Guzman, the Convent of Santa Cruz was the first to be founded by the Order of Preachers in Spain in 1218, just two years after the creation of the mendicant order of the Dominicans. Diego de Colmenares, a 16th-century chronicler, adds that Saint Dominic did penance in a cave near the river to the north of the city, outside its walls and that he founded the order in this spot.

The order's dedication to the holy cross also originates from the early times of this community according to Colmenares and other 14th century documents.

In the fifteenth century the Catholic Monarchs, as King Ferdinand and Queen Isabella were known, gave their patronage to the convent and this royal protection was what led it to be known as Santa Cruz “la Real”, i.e. the convent of the “Royal” Holy Cross. Although the city's institutions had played a part in the convent's development, the Dominicans were not a prosperous order until the Catholic Monarchs came to the throne, when they were given control of the Inquisition. The convent was rebuilt over the former 13th century Romanesque structure and the current church, with its monumental portal, was also erected under Friar Tomás de Torquemada, the first Grand Inquisitor and prior of the Holy Cross community.

The Dominican presence in the convent lasted until the monks were released from their religious vows as decreed by the minister Mendizábal in 1836. The convent then became a hospice and, until recent times, it was a nursing home for the elderly under the ownership of the Segovia Provincial Council. It has since undergone extensive renovation to house IE University.

Aula Magna 

The convent church was designed by fifteenth century Spanish architect Juan Guasa, and is a faithful example of late gothic architecture. It now serves as IE University's Aula Magna, being used for graduation ceremonies and conferences; it is never used for other key events.

Programmes of study

Undergraduate programmes 
Bachelor of:
 Architectural Studies (BAS)
 Design (BID)
 Business Administration (BBA)
 Communications and Digital Media (BCDM)
 Information Systems Management (BIS)
 Law (LLB)
 Economics (BIE)
 Philosophy, Politics, Law and Economics (PPLE)
 Behavioural Sciences (BBS)
 International Relations (BIR)
 Data and Business Analytics (BDBA)
 Computer Science and Artificial Intelligence (BCSAI)
 Dual Degree in Business Administration and Data and Business Analytics (BBABDBA)
 Dual Degree in Business Administration and Law (BBALLB)
 Dual Degree in Business Administration and International Relations (BBABIR) 
 Dual Degree in Business Administration and Design (BBABID)
 Dual Degree in Law and International Relations (LLBBIR)
 Dual Degree in Philosophy, Politics, Law, Economics and Data and Business Analytics (PPLEBDBA)
 IE Brown Summer Programme

Notable alumni

References

External links 

IE University website

 
1997 establishments in Spain
Private universities and colleges in Spain
Educational institutions established in 1997
Universities established in the 1990s